Doctor in the Swim is a 1962 comedy novel by the British writer Richard Gordon. It is part of the long-running Doctor series, and follows the womanising Doctor Grimsdyke as he gets into a number of scrapes.

References

Bibliography
 Pringle, David. Imaginary People: A Who's who of Fictional Characters from the Eighteenth Century to the Present Day. Scolar Press, 1996.

1962 British novels
Novels by Richard Gordon
Comedy novels
Medical novels
Michael Joseph books